Arthrobotrys is a genus  of mitosporic fungi in the family Orbiliaceae. There are 71 species. They are predatory fungi that capture and feed on nematode worms. Rings that form on the hyphae constrict and entrap the worms, then hyphae grow into the worm and digest it.

Species 
Arthrobotrys aggregata Mekht. 1979
Arthrobotrys alaskana Matsush.) Oorschot 1985
Arthrobotrys amerospora S. Schenck, W.B. Kendr. & Pramer 1977
Arthrobotrys anomala G.L. Barron & J.G.N. Davidson 1972
Arthrobotrys apscheronica Mekht. 1973
Arthrobotrys arthrobotryoides (Berl.) Lindau 1906
Arthrobotrys azerbaijanica (Mekht.) Oorschot 1985
Arthrobotrys bakunika Mekht. 1979
Arthrobotrys botryospora G.L. Barron 1979
Arthrobotrys brochopaga (Drechsler) S. Schenck, W.B. Kendr. & Pramer 1977
Arthrobotrys chazarica Mekht. 1998
Arthrobotrys chilensis Allesch. & Henn. 1897
Arthrobotrys cladodes Drechsler 1937
Arthrobotrys clavispora (R.C. Cooke) S. Schenck, W.B. Kendr. & Pramer 1977
Arthrobotrys compacta Mekht. 1973
Arthrobotrys conoides Drechsler 1937
Arthrobotrys constringens Dowsett, J. Reid & Kalkat 1984
Arthrobotrys cylindrospora (R.C. Cooke) S. Schenck, W.B. Kendr. & Pramer 1977
Arthrobotrys dactyloides Drechsler 1937
Arthrobotrys deflectens Bres. 1903
Arthrobotrys dendroides Kuthub., Muid & J. Webster 1985
Arthrobotrys doliiformis Soprunov 1958
Arthrobotrys drechsleri Soprunov 1958
Arthrobotrys elegans (Subram. & Chandrash.) Seifert & W.B. Kendr. 1983
Arthrobotrys ellipsospora Tubaki & K. Yamanaka 1984
Arthrobotrys entomopaga Drechsler 1944
Arthrobotrys ferox Onofri & S. Tosi 1992
Arthrobotrys foliicola Matsush. 1975
Arthrobotrys fruticulosa Mekht. 1979
Arthrobotrys globospora (Soprunov) Sidorova, Gorlenko & Nalepina 1964,(Soprunov) Mekht. 1964
Arthrobotrys haptospora (Drechsler) S. Schenck, W.B. Kendr. & Pramer 1977
Arthrobotrys hertziana M. Scholler & A. Rubner 1999
Arthrobotrys indica (Chowdhry & Bahl) M. Scholler, Hagedorn & A. Rubner 1999
Arthrobotrys irregularis (Matr.) Mekht. 1971
Arthrobotrys javanica (Rifai & R.C. Cooke) Jarow. 1970
Arthrobotrys kirghizica Soprunov 1958
Arthrobotrys longa Mekht. 1973
Arthrobotrys longiphora (Xing Z. Liu & B.S. Lu) M. Scholler, Hagedorn & A. Rubner 1999
Arthrobotrys longiramulifera Matsush. 1995
Arthrobotrys longispora Soprunov, Preuss 1853
Arthrobotrys mangrovispora Swe, Jeewon, Pointing & K.D. Hyde 2008
Arthrobotrys megaspora (Boedijn) Oorschot 1985
Arthrobotrys microscaphoides (Xing Z. Liu & B.S. Lu) M. Scholler, Hagedorn & A. Rubner 1999
Arthrobotrys microspora (Soprunov) Mekht. 1971
Arthrobotrys multisecundaria W.F. Hu & K.Q. Zhang 2006
Arthrobotrys musiformis Drechsler 1937
Arthrobotrys nematopaga (Mekht. & Faizieva) A. Rubner 1996
Arthrobotrys nonseptata Z.F. Yu, S.F. Li & K.Q. Zhang 2009
Arthrobotrys oligospora Fresen. 1850
Arthrobotrys oudemansii M. Scholler, Hagedorn & A. Rubner 2000
Arthrobotrys oviformis Soprunov 1958
Arthrobotrys perpasta (R.C. Cooke) Jarow. 1970
Arthrobotrys polycephala (Drechsler) Rifai 1968
Arthrobotrys pseudoclavata (Z.Q. Miao & Xing Z. Liu) J. Chen, L.L. Xu, B. Liu & Xing Z. Liu 2007
Arthrobotrys pyriformis (Juniper) Schenk, W.B. Kendr. & Pramer 1977
Arthrobotrys recta Preuss 1851
Arthrobotrys robusta Dudd. 1952
Arthrobotrys rosea Massee 1885
Arthrobotrys scaphoides (Peach) S. Schenck, W.B. Kendr. & Pramer 1977
Arthrobotrys sclerohypha (Drechsler) S. Schenck, W.B. Kendr. & Pramer 1977
Arthrobotrys shahriari (Mekht.) M. Scholler, Hagedorn & A. Rubner 1999
Arthrobotrys shizishanna (X.F. Liu & K.Q. Zhang) J. Chen, L.L. Xu, B. Liu & Xing Z. Liu 2007
Arthrobotrys sinensis (Xing Z. Liu & K.Q. Zhang) M. Scholler, Hagedorn & A. Rubner 1999
Arthrobotrys soprunovii Mekht. 1979
Arthrobotrys stilbacea J.A. Mey. 1958
Arthrobotrys straminicola Pidopl. 1948
Arthrobotrys superba Corda 1839
Arthrobotrys tabrizica (Mekht.) M. Scholler, Hagedorn & A. Rubner 1999
Arthrobotrys venusta K.Q. Zhang 1994
Arthrobotrys vermicola (R.C. Cooke & Satchuth.) Rifai 1968
Arthrobotrys yunnanensis M.H. Mo & K.Q. Zhang 2005

References 

 http://www.indexfungorum.org

Ascomycota genera
Fungal pest control agents
Pezizomycotina